The barony of Strabane is a former barony of Ireland, situated in County Tyrone. It is named after the settlement of Strabane and was later divided into the baronies of Strabane Lower and Strabane Upper.

Baronies of County Tyrone